Salvadoran passports are issued to citizens of El Salvador to travel outside the country.

Passports are issued by the Ministry of Foreign Affairs or, if the citizen resides abroad, at the Salvadoran embassy. Besides serving as proof of identity and of citizenship, they facilitate the process of securing assistance from Salvadoran consular officials abroad, if needed. Citizens can not have multiple Salvadoran passports at the same time.

Appearance

Like all Central American passports the cover is navy with gold fonts stating the official name of the country in Spanish and in English. A map of Central America is displayed with the Salvadoran territory shaded.

Identity information page
The Salvadoran passport includes the following data:
 Type ('P' - Passport)
 Code for issuing country ("SLV" - Salvadoran)
 Passport Number
 Name of bearer
 Nationality
 Date of birth
 Sex
 Mother name 
 Place of birth
 Date of issue
 Date of expiry
 Booklet Number
 Issuing Authority

Language
The data page is printed in Spanish and English, while the personal data is entered in Spanish.

Visa pages
The Salvadoran passport contains 48 pages, of which one page (the first one) shows the information of the document holder, suitable for visas and border stamps.

Central America-4 Border Control Agreement
The Central America-4 Border Control Agreement (CA-4) was a treaty signed in June 2006 between the Central American nations of El Salvador, Guatemala, Honduras and Nicaragua, establishing the free movement across borders between the four signatory states of their citizens without any restrictions or checks. Foreign nationals who enter one of the signatory countries can also travel to other signatory states without having to obtain additional permits or to undergo checks at border checkpoints.

Visa requirements for Salvadoran citizens

As of 1 June 2021, Salvadoran citizens had visa-free or visa free access to 134 countries and territories, ranking the Salvadoran passport 37th in terms of travel freedom according to the Henley visa restrictions index.

See also
 Central America-4 passport
 Visa requirements for El Salvador citizens
 Visa policy of El Salvador
 List of diplomatic missions of El Salvador
 Ministry of Foreign Affairs of El Salvador

References
 Council regulation 539/2001 
 Council regulation 1932/2006 
 Council regulation 539/2001 consolidated version, 19.1.2007 
 List of nationals who do need a visa to visit the UK .
 List of countries whose passport holders do not require visas to enter Ireland .

External links
 Ministry of Foreign Affairs of El Salvador

Government of El Salvador
Passports by country